Say That to Say This is an album by Troy 'Trombone Shorty' Andrews. It was his third album for Verve Records, and was co-produced by Raphael Saadiq. The AllMusic reviewer concluded: "with all of its confidence, production polish, and sophistication, this is the album that should break Trombone Shorty to a much wider, more diverse audience."

Track listing

Personnel
Troy 'Trombone Shorty' Andrews - Trombone, Lead Vocals
Pete Murano - Guitar
Michael Ballard - Bass Guitar
Joey Peebles - Drums
Dan Oestreicher - Baritone Saxophone
BK Jackson - Tenor Saxophone

References

Trombone Shorty albums
2013 albums